Lachnocnema triangularis is a butterfly in the family Lycaenidae. It is found in the Republic of the Congo, the eastern part of the Democratic Republic of the Congo and Uganda.

References

Butterflies described in 1996
Taxa named by Michel Libert
Miletinae